Privat-Antoine Aubouard (14 August 1874 in Moulins – 9 October 1934 in Beirut) was a Lebanese politician and a member of the French High Commission who became acting President of Lebanon for one month, from 2 to 30 January 1934 for the interim period in transfer of presidency from Charles Debbas, the first president of the Lebanese Republic under the French Mandate 1926 to 1934 and president Habib Pacha Es-Saad, the second president for 1934 to 1936.

See also
List of presidents of Lebanon

References

1874 births
1934 deaths
Politicians from Moulins, Allier
Presidents of Lebanon
Lebanon under French rule
People from the Ottoman Empire